Portugal participated in the Eurovision Song Contest 2018 with the song "O jardim" written by Isaura. The song was performed by Cláudia Pascoal. In addition to participating in the contest, the Portuguese broadcaster Rádio e Televisão de Portugal (RTP) also hosted the Eurovision Song Contest after winning the competition in 2017 with the song "Amar pelos dois" performed by Salvador Sobral. RTP organised the national final Festival da Canção 2018 in order to select the Portuguese entry for the 2018 contest in Lisbon. After two semi-finals and a final which took place in February and March 2018, "O jardim" performed by Cláudia Pascoal and featuring Isaura emerged as the winner after achieving the highest score following the combination of votes from seven regional juries and a public televote.

As the host country, Portugal qualified to compete directly in the final of the Eurovision Song Contest. Portugal's running order position was determined by draw. Performing in position 8 during the final, Portugal placed twenty-sixth (last) out of the 26 participating countries with 39 points.

Background 
Prior to the 2018 contest, Portugal had participated in the Eurovision Song Contest forty-nine times since its first entry in 1964. Portugal had won the contest on one occasion: in 2017 with the song "Amar pelos dois" performed by Salvador Sobral. Following the introduction of semi-finals for the 2004, Portugal had featured in only four finals. Portugal's least successful result has been last place, which they have achieved on three occasions, most recently in 1997 with the song "Antes do adeus" performed by Célia Lawson. Portugal has also received nul points on two occasions; in 1964 and 1997.

The Portuguese national broadcaster, Rádio e Televisão de Portugal (RTP), broadcasts the event within Portugal and organises the selection process for the nation's entry. The broadcaster has traditionally selected the Portuguese entry for the Eurovision Song Contest via the music competition Festival da Canção, with exceptions in 1988 and 2005 when the Portuguese entries were internally selected. On 25 July 2017, the broadcaster revealed details regarding their selection procedure and announced the organization of Festival da Canção 2018 in order to select the 2018 Portuguese entry.

Before Eurovision

Festival da Canção 2018 

Festival da Canção 2018 was the 52nd edition of Festival da Canção that selected Portugal's entry for the Eurovision Song Contest 2018. Twenty-six entries competed in the competition that consisted of two semi-finals held on 18 and 25 February 2018 leading to an fourteen-song final on 4 March 2018. All three shows of the competition were broadcast on RTP1, RTP África and RTP Internacional as well as on radio via Antena 1 and online via RTP Play with commentary by Joana Martins and Rita Correia. For the first time in the history of the competition, the shows were broadcast on RTP Acessibilidades with Sofia Figueiredo and Cláudia Dias presenting in Portuguese Sign Language.

Format 
The format of the competition consisted of three shows: two semi-finals on 18 and 25 February 2018 and the final on 4 March 2018. Each semi-final featured thirteen competing entries from which seven advanced from each show to complete the fourteen song lineup in the final. Results during the semi-finals were determined by the 50/50 combination of votes from a jury panel appointed by RTP and public televoting, while results during the final were determined by the 50/50 combination of votes from seven regional juries and public televoting, which was opened following the second semi-final and closed during the final show. Both the public televote and the juries assigned points from 1-8, 10 and 12 based on the ranking developed by both streams of voting.

Competing entries 
Twenty-six composers were selected by RTP through four methods: twenty-two nominated by journalist and music critic Nuno Galopim and Antena 3 presenter Henrique Amaro and invited by RTP for the competition, two selected from 346 submissions received through an open call for songs, one invited by the Festival da Canção 2017 winner Salvador Sobral and one selected from the Antena 1 radio show MasterClass featuring composers without any published work. The composers, which both created the songs and selected its performers, were required to submit the final versions of their entries by 31 December 2017. Songs could be submitted in any language other than Portuguese. The selected composers were revealed on 27 September 2017, while the competing artists were revealed on 18 January 2018. Among the competing artists were former Eurovision Song Contest entrants José Cid, who represented Portugal in the 1980 and 1998 contests (the latter as part of the group Alma Lusa) and Anabela, who represented Portugal in the 1993 contest.

Shows

Semi-finals
The two semi-finals took place at RTP's Studio 1 in Lisbon on 18 and 25 February 2018. The first semi-final was hosted by Jorge Gabriel and José Carlos Malato while the second semi-final was hosted by Sónia Araújo and Tânia Ribas de Oliveira. In each semi-final thirteen entries competed and seven advanced to the final based on the 50/50 combination of votes from a jury panel consisting of Júlio Isidro, Ana Bacalhau, Ana Markl, António Avelar de Pinho, Carlão, Luísa Sobral, Mário Lopes, Sara Tavares and Tozé Brito, and a public televote. Following the first semi-final, a mistake with the televoting results was detected and corrected following the show. Diogo Piçarra, who qualified from the second semi-final, withdrew his song "Canção do fim" from the final on 27 February 2018 following plagiarism accusations. The entry was replaced with the song "Mensageira", performed by Susana Travassos, which placed eighth in the second semi-final.

In addition to the performances of the competing entries, João Pedro Coimbra and Nuno Figueiredo performed as the interval act in the first semi-final, while Herman José performed as the interval act in the second semi-final.

Final
The final took place at the Pavilhão Multiusos in Guimarães on 4 March 2018, hosted by Filomena Cautela and Pedro Fernandes. The fourteen entries that qualified from the two preceding semi-finals competed and the winner, "O jardim" performed by Cláudia Pascoal, was selected based on the 50/50 combination of votes of seven regional juries and a public televote. In addition to the performances of the competing entries, Luísa Sobral, Portuguese Eurovision 1965 entrant and 1969 entrant Simone de Oliveira and Portuguese Eurovision 1982 entrant Doce performed as the interval acts. Catarina Miranda and Cláudia Pascoal were both tied at 22 points each but since Cláudia Pascoal received more votes from the public she was declared the winner.

Promotion 
Prior to the contest, Cláudia Pascoal specifically promoted "O jardim" as the Portuguese Eurovision entry on 21 April 2018 by performing during the ESPreParty event which was held at the Sala La Riviera venue in Madrid, Spain and hosted by Soraya Arnelas.

At Eurovision 

All countries except the "Big Five" (France, Germany, Italy, Spain and the United Kingdom) and the host country, are required to qualify from one of two semi-finals in order to compete for the final; the top ten countries from each semi-final progress to the final. As the host country, Portugal automatically qualified to compete in the final on 12 May 2018. In addition to their participation in the final, Portugal is also required to broadcast and vote in one of the two semi-finals, which was decided via a draw held during the semi-final allocation draw on 29 January 2018. Portugal was assigned to broadcast and vote in the first semi-final, to be held on 8 May 2018.

In Portugal, the three shows were broadcast on RTP1, RTP África and RTP Internacional with commentary by Nuno Galopim and Hélder Reis. The final was also broadcast via radio on Antena 1, RDP África and RDP Internacional with commentary by Noémia Gonçalves, António Macedo and Tozé Brito. The Portuguese spokesperson, who announced the top 12-point score awarded by the Portuguese jury during the final, was Pedro Fernandes.

Final

Cláudia Pascoal took part in technical rehearsals on 4 and 6 May, followed by dress rehearsals on 7, 11 and 12 May. This included the semi-final jury show on 7 May where an extended clip of the Portuguese performance was filmed for broadcast during the live show on 8 May and the jury final on 11 May where the professional juries of each country watched and voted on the competing entries. As the host nation, Portugal's running order position in the final was decided through a random draw that took place during the Heads of Delegation meeting in Lisbon on 12 March 2018. Portugal was drawn to perform in position 8. Following the second semi-final, the shows' producers decided upon the running order of the final rather than through another draw, so that similar songs were not placed next to each other. While Portugal had already been drawn to perform in position 8, it was determined that Portugal would perform following Norway and before the entry from United Kingdom.

The Portuguese performance featured Cláudia Pascoal wearing a black dress and surrounded by gold lights, which increase in number throughout the performance, performing together with the composer of "O jardim" Isaura who was later revealed to be standing beside Pascoal by an overhead spotlight. Portugal placed twenty-sixth (last) in the final, scoring 39 points: 18 points from the televoting and 21 points from the juries.

Voting 
Voting during the three shows involved each country awarding two sets of points from 1-8, 10 and 12: one from their professional jury and the other from televoting. Each nation's jury consisted of five music industry professionals who are citizens of the country they represent, with their names published before the contest to ensure transparency. This jury judged each entry based on: vocal capacity; the stage performance; the song's composition and originality; and the overall impression by the act. In addition, no member of a national jury was permitted to be related in any way to any of the competing acts in such a way that they cannot vote impartially and independently. The individual rankings of each jury member as well as the nation's televoting results were released shortly after the grand final.

Below is a breakdown of points awarded to Portugal and awarded by Portugal in the first semi-final and grand final of the contest, and the breakdown of the jury voting and televoting conducted during the two shows:

Points awarded to Portugal

Points awarded by Portugal

Detailed voting results
The following members comprised the Portuguese jury:
 Armando Teixeira (jury chairperson)composer, singer, producer
 Daniela Rute Rodrigues (Daniela Onis)composer, singer
 Anabela Braz Pires (Anabela)singer, actress, represented Portugal in the 1993 contest
 Luis Manuel Oliveira Nunes (Benjamim)composer, producer
 Pedro Lopes Madureira Silva Miguel (Peu Madureira)singer

References

External links
 Official Festival da Canção site

2018
Countries in the Eurovision Song Contest 2018
Eurovision